Blues Productions is an Indian Bengali-language television serial and film production company based in Kolkata, incorporated on 2006. Blues Productions Pvt Ltd has 2 creative directors/key management personnel - Snehasish Chakraborty and Debasish Chakraborty. They started off with shows like Krishnakoli Tarei Bol and Kokhono Megh Kokhono Brishti and went on to produce more shows on Bengali Television including @Bhalobasha.com, Jarowar Jhumko, Stree, Khokababu, Rakhi Bandhan, Hriday Haran B.A. Pass, Aanchol, Bene Bou, Tapur Tupur, Khukumoni Home Delivery, Khelaghor, Bhojo Gobindo, Gangaram, Jagaddhatri and Jamuna Dhaki.

Current TV shows

Film productions 
Promotion (Bengali) (2013)

Former TV shows

References

Companies based in Kolkata
Television production companies of India
Entertainment companies of India
Entertainment companies established in 2006
2006 establishments in West Bengal
Indian companies established in 2006